Three ships and a naval base of the Royal Australian Navy have been named HMAS Brisbane after Brisbane, the capital city of Queensland.

, a Town-class light cruiser launched in 1915 and decommissioned in 1935
, a naval base operated in Brisbane between 1940 and 1942
, a Perth-class guided missile destroyer launched in 1966 and decommissioned in 2001
, a Hobart-class air warfare destroyer commissioned in 2018

Battle honours
Ships of the name HMAS Brisbane have earned three battle honours.

 Indian Ocean 1917
 Vietnam 1969–71
 Kuwait 1991

References

Royal Australian Navy ship names